The 2012 ISU World Team Trophy was an international team figure skating competition in the 2011–12 season. Participating countries selected two men's single skaters, two ladies' single skaters, one pair and one ice dancing entry to compete in a team format with points based on the skaters' placement.

Background
The event was originally scheduled to be held on April 14–17, 2011 in Yokohama, Japan, but the Tōhoku earthquake and tsunami led to the event's postponement. It was rescheduled to April 19–22, 2012 in Tokyo, Japan.

Japan qualified in first place with 7,891 points, followed by Canada (6,943), Russia (6,807), the United States (6,399), Italy (5,412), and France (5,214). The total prize money at the World Team Trophy paid by the Japan Skating Federation is US$1 million, the highest of any ISU event.

World Team Trophy medals are awarded to the national teams. Skaters who place in the top three of their discipline receive gifts rather than individual medals.

Entries

Results

Competition notes
Daisuke Takahashi set a world record to win the men's short program, scoring 94.00 points. Carolina Kostner won the ladies' short program, while Meryl Davis / Charlie White were first in the short dance. On the second day of competition, Takahashi won the men's event, Davis and White won the ice dancing event, and Narumi Takahashi / Mervin Tran won the pairs' short program. On the final day of the World Team Trophy, Akiko Suzuki won the ladies' event and Vera Bazarova / Yuri Larionov the pairs' event. Team Japan won the title overall, with Team USA taking the silver medal. Team Canada and Team France were tied, with Canada winning the tiebreaker to claim the bronze medal. Team France won the organizing committee's team spirit award.

Team standings

Men

Ladies

Pairs

Ice dancing

Prize money

References

External links

 Results
 Entries
 Official website

Isu World Team Trophy In Figure Skating, 2012
ISU World Team Trophy in Figure Skating